Dai Jun (born 29 March 1966) is a Chinese speed skater. He competed in two events at the 1992 Winter Olympics.

References

1966 births
Living people
Chinese male speed skaters
Olympic speed skaters of China
Speed skaters at the 1992 Winter Olympics
Place of birth missing (living people)
20th-century Chinese people